James S. "Jack" Darragh (July 17, 1866 – August 12, 1939) was a first baseman in Major League Baseball in the 19th century. He played for the Louisville Colonels of the American Association in 1891. He went to the University of Pennsylvania.

Minor League career
After the 1891 Colonels season, Darragh played for the Philadelphia Athletics in the Eastern League in 1892. He then played for and managed the East Liverpool East End All Stars in the Ohio-Michigan League in 1893.

Sources

External links

1866 births
1939 deaths
People from Ebensburg, Pennsylvania
Baseball players from Pennsylvania
Major League Baseball first basemen
Louisville Colonels players
19th-century baseball players
Philadelphia Athletics (minor league) players
East Liverpool East End All Stars players